Bi'r bin Ghunayma  is a village in the Al Wahat District in north-eastern Cyrenaica, Libya. Bi'r bin Ghunayma is located about 250 km south of the city of Bayda.

References

Populated places in Al Wahat District